The 11th District of the Iowa Senate is located in southwestern Iowa, and is currently composed of Adams, Cass, Pottawattamie, and Union Counties.

Current elected officials
Tom Shipley is the senator currently representing the 11th District.

The area of the 11th District contains two Iowa House of Representatives districts:
The 21st District (represented by Tom Moore)
The 22nd District (represented by Jon Jacobsen)

The district is also located in Iowa's 3rd congressional district, which is represented by U.S. Representative Cindy Axne.

Past senators
The district has previously been represented by:

John Jensen, 1983–2002
William Dotzler, 2003–2012
Hubert Houser, 2013–2014
Tom Shipley, 2015–present

See also
Iowa General Assembly
Iowa Senate

References

11